Anand Dighe, (27 January 1951- 26 August 2001)  popularly known as Dharmaveer was a senior leader & Thane district Unit Chief of Shiv Sena. He mentored many young politicians from Thane region such as Eknath Shinde & Rajan Vichare.

Career
Dighe joined politics at young age. He became President of Shivsena's Thane Unit in 1984. Dighe was a grassroot leader with a large fan base. He was popularly known as Dharmaveer. He was considered a powerful muscleman in Thane.  He would hold a daily Durbar at his Tembhi Naka residence to hear out/resolve issues faced by Thane citizens along with Shiv Sena party workers.

Dighe was accused in the murder of Shiv Sena party member Sridhar Khopkar, who had allegedly voted for Congress in 1989. Dighe was arrested under TADA and was out on bail. The case continued until his death.

Death
Dighe was admitted in August 2001 after a car accident. He suffered from minor injuries on his leg. During his treatment, hospital management announced that Dighe died of a heart attack. His followers believed that he died because of medical negligence and as a result, his followers burned the Sunitadevi Singhania Hospital in Thane where he died. Few followers believed that he was killed due to his popularity. There are many conspiracy theories related to Anand Dighe's death.

In 2019 Nilesh Rane said “what really happened to Anand Dighe. How the conspiracy was planned and how the death was shown as having happened in the hospital later.” The senior Rane, once a Sena leader who defected to the Congress in 2005 and later joined the BJP in 2019, disowned the statements by Nilesh Rane “I will not support something wrong. Dighe did not die because someone killed him. I was the last person to meet Dighe then, and he passed away a few seconds after I left. His condition was very serious when I went there. The Doctors were trying hard. I went outside and called Balasaheb (late Shiv Sena supremo Bal Thackeray) and asked him to do something and send Dr Nitu Mandke (a renowned cardiologist)... Nitu Mandke spoke to me, but before he reached, Dighe passed away,” Narayan Rane said adding that allegations of foul play held no water.

Popular culture
Dharmaveer biopic was based on Anand Dighe's life. In this biopic Anand Dighe's role is performed by actor Prasad Oak.

References 

People from Thane
Shiv Sena politicians
1951 births
2001 deaths
Marathi politicians
Maharashtra politicians
Politics of Thane district